Filler is material of lower cost or quality that is used to fill a certain television time slot or physical medium, such as a music album.

Television
In the early days of television, most output was live. The hours of broadcast were limited, and so a test card was commonly broadcast at other times. When a breakdown happened during a live broadcast, a standard recording filled in. On the BBC, a film of a potter's wheel was often used for this purpose, filmed at the Compton Potters' Arts Guild. Similar short films, such as a kitten playing, were also used as interludes or interstitial programs to fill gaps in TV schedules. In the United States, these have their roots in the old Saturday afternoon horror movies hosted on independent stations. The fishcam is a particularly widespread form of filler in this tradition.

In anime, most of the time filler arcs are due to the higher rate at which episodes are released than the original manga, from which the anime draws its source material. Notable anime to feature high amount of filler include Dragon Ball Z, Naruto and Bleach.

Music albums
Albums of music were typically of a set size determined by the physical medium such as the vinyl record (typically 22 minutes per side) or CD (maximum 80 minutes). It was normal, especially in the 1960s, for artists to attempt to "pad out" their material to the standard length by including filler tracks of lesser quality.

Often, songs written by the artists or the producer of an album were included as filler and/or released on the b-side of singles to generate more royalties for the songwriter or artist.

Cover versions are often considered to be fillers, though this judgement varies with the amount of creative interpretation and adaption of the original. Similarly, live recordings, demo versions or remixes follow the same argument.

On the subject of music downloads, Courtney Love told the Digital Hollywood conference "If you're afraid of your own filler then I bet you're afraid of Napster", meaning that other artists may be afraid of listeners being able to listen to a full album before buying it.

See also
 Bus plunge
 Evergreen content
 Screen saver
 Slow television

References

Television terminology
Interstitial television shows